A partial lunar eclipse will take place on October 8, 2052.

Visibility

Related lunar eclipses

Lunar year series

See also 
List of lunar eclipses and List of 21st-century lunar eclipses

Notes

External links 
 

2052-10
2052-10
2052 in science